This is a list of schools in linguistics.
Columbia School of Linguistics
Copenhagen School
Formal linguistics
Functional linguistics
Systemic functional linguistics
Sydney School
Leiden School
London School of Linguistics
Moscow School of Comparative Linguistics
Prague linguistic circle
Structural linguistics

 
schools